Villa Dulce (English: Sweet Village) is a Chilean animated series created by Beatriz Buttazzoni and Francisco Bobadilla of Empatía Productions in 2004 and broadcast in Canal 13 network. Villa Dulce was a historical series in Chile because it was the first animated TV program made in the country since Condorito's shorts in the 80s.

Since its debut on March 6, 2004 the show has broadcast 26 episodes and 2 specials and was a strong influence for the creation of others Chilean animation series after Villa Dulce success, like Clarita, Diego y Glot, Pulentos and El Ojo del Gato.

Settings
Villa Dulce idea was planned by Beatriz Buttazzoni and Francisco Bobadilla around 2003, inspired by his own experiences in the original town that they live, Villa Dulce in Viña del Mar (also two scriptwriters of the series lives there) but instead of use the same place, they created a fictional town called "Villa Dulce" who resembles Santiago de Chile. This community is governed by a mayor called Tuscan Epifanio and where 13 children between 8 and 11 years and some adults lives.

Villa Dulce stands out to portray the situations that the children of 11 years old experiment in the country, including situations that the creators of Villa Dulce call "kiddie black humor", this is, as how they imagines the reality according to the glance of the children with situations like the end of the world, reality shows, the UFOs, and others issues. In addition Villa Dulce includes some characters who represent generally the stereotypes of the Chilean society like the high-class (cuicos), low class (flaites) and tweens.

The series has been heavily compared with the American animated series South Park, Francisco Bobadilla has denied the similarities:

See also
2004 in television

References

2000s animated television series
2004 Chilean television series debuts
2006 Chilean television series endings
Chilean animated television series
Chilean children's animated comedy television series
Animated television series about children
Flash television shows